Te Quiero (English: I love you) is a Mexican motion picture categorized as drama and romance. It was filmed in 1978 and released in 1979.

Synopsis  
Claudia is an administrator in the successful company of her father. When he realizes his daughter suffers from a terminal decease he plans a trip for her to the Caribbean Sea, so she can enjoy her last days and her father hires a man to accompany his daughter. Eventually they fall in love and she realizes about the illness, she walks away, but she was already in love.

Cast 
 Fernando Allende
 Daniela Romo
 Joaquín Cordero
 Blanca Sánchez
 Evangelina Elizondo
 Pedro Galván	
 Yogi Ruge
 José Nájera
 Luis Uribe
 Abel Casillas
 Verónica Fernández
 Fernando Pinkus

References

External links 
 

1979 films
Mexican romantic drama films
1970s Spanish-language films
1979 romantic drama films
1970s Mexican films